Pano language may refer to:
the Mur Pano language of New Guinea
the Malasanga language of New Guinea
the Panobo language of Peru
one of the other Panoan languages